The Channel Tunnel Act 1987 (c. 53) is an Act of the Parliament of the United Kingdom which authorised the construction of the Channel Tunnel between the United Kingdom and France in accordance with the Treaty of Canterbury, which was signed in 1986. Section 2 of the Act forbade any public subsidy of the project.

Notes

This Act enables to be written Statutory Instruments:

 the Channel Tunnel (International Arrangements) Order 1993, whereby the European Union agreement on border control known as the Sangatte Protocol was brought into jurisdiction by the Lord Chancellor, the Secretary of State for the Home Department, the Secretary of State for Health, the Minister of Agriculture, Fisheries and Food and the Commissioners of Customs and Excise.  The Sangatte Protocol is a 12-page document written in the national language of each state, which deals with responsibility for, inter alia, asylum applications. The French legislated it by Décret n°93-1136.
 the Channel Tunnel (Miscellaneous Provisions) Order 1994.

For sea-related matters, see the Nationality, Immigration and Asylum Act 2002, and the Nationality, Immigration and Asylum Act 2002 (Juxtaposed Controls) Order 2003.

The Immigration Act 1971 allows the search of vehicles and the control checkpoint analogous to those at Heathrow Airport.

References

United Kingdom Acts of Parliament 1987
Right of asylum legislation in the United Kingdom
Channel Tunnel